Denise Leese Eger (born March 14, 1960) is an American Reform rabbi. In March 2015, she became president of the Central Conference of American Rabbis,  the largest and oldest rabbinical organization in North America; she was the first openly gay person to hold that position.

Biography 
Denise Eger was born in New Kensington, Pennsylvania,  the 2nd daughter of Bernard Eger and Estelle (Leese) Eger. She was raised in Memphis, Tennessee. She studied voice at Memphis State University, then transferred to the University of Southern California, where she majored in religion.  She then studied at Hebrew Union College-Jewish Institute of Religion, from which she earned a master's degree, and went on to pursue rabbinic studies. She came out publicly as gay in 1990 in a story in the Los Angeles Times.

Career 
Prior to ordination, Eger served as a rabbinic internship for the Chaverim group in Westwood, for the 1983–84 term. She then became an intern in 1985-86 under Rabbi Solomon F. Kleinman at Temple Ahavat Shalom Northridge in Southern California. Rabbi Eger was ordained in 1988 at the New York campus of Hebrew Union College, following which she served as the first full-time rabbi of Beth Chayim Chadashim in Los Angeles, the world's first gay and lesbian synagogue recognized by Reform Judaism. In 1992, she and 25 other people founded Congregation Kol Ami, a synagogue intended to serve both gay and non-gay Jews in West Hollywood, California. Kol Ami has flourished into a 350-member congregation. Significant accomplishments include successfully fundraising to purchase land and construct an award-winning building, located on LaBrea avenue in West Hollywood, which was completed in 2001, and building an endowment that contributes 15 percent of the synagogue's annual operating budge

She previously served as the chair of the Search Alliance Institutional Review Board and Treasurer of the Women's Rabbinic Network, and is a past president of the Pacific Association of Reform Rabbis. She chaired the Gay and Lesbian Rabbinic Network of the Central Conference of American Rabbis and is past chair of the Task Force on Gays and Lesbians in the Rabbinate. She is a founding member of the Religion and Faith Council of the Human Rights Campaign and a founding executive committee member of California Faith for Equality. She is a Senior Rabbinic Fellow of the Shalom Hartman Institute.

Rabbi Eger was instrumental in helping pass the March 2000 CCAR resolution in support of officiation and gay and lesbian weddings. She is co-author of the official Reform movement gay and lesbian wedding liturgy. She officiated at the wedding of activists Robin Tyler and Diane Olson, on June 16, 2008.

In 2009, she became the first female and the first openly gay President of the Board of Rabbis of Southern California. She was also the founding President of the Lesbian, Gay, & Bisexual Interfaith Clergy Association. In the summer of 2010 she was named one of the fifty most influential women rabbis.

In March 2015, she became president of the Central Conference of American Rabbis,  the largest and oldest rabbinical organization in North America; she is the first openly gay person to hold that position. As head of the 2300 member international organization of Reform Rabbis, her achievements include revitalizing the ethics code by instituting mandatory continuing education; increasing CCAR's visibility by transforming the process for adoption of resolutions on public policy issues, and effective social media and press strategies; developing international relationships among Reform Rabbis serving outside North America; and strengthened governance by instituting term limits for committee chairs and members. Through her initiative, the CCAR created mandatory continuing education requirements for its members.

Author and editor
Rabbi Eger is co-editor of the book Gender & Religious Leadership: Women Rabbis, Pastors and Ministers (Rowman & Littlefield, 2019). She is the editor of the groundbreaking book Mishkan Ga'avah: Where Pride Dwells, A Celebration of LGBTQ Jewish Life and Ritual (CCAR Press, 2020). This is a collection of prayers and rituals for LGBTQ Jews and allies as well as ceremonies for LGBTQ significant moments and life cycle events.

She has contributed articles to numerous publications including, The Social Justice Torah Commentary, (ed. Barry Block, CCAR Press, 2021), The Sacred Calling: Four Decades of Women in the Rabbinate (ed. Schorr & Graf, CCAR Press, 2016), Torah Queeries (ed. Drinkwater, Schneer, & Lesser, NYU Press, 2009), and Contemporary Debates in Reform Judaism (ed. Kaplan, Routledge 2001).

She is a noted author contributing to anthologies such as Torah Queeries, Lesbian Rabbis, Twice Blessed, and Conflicting Visions: Contemporary Debates in Reform Judaism. She wrote the piece "Creating Opportunities for the 'Other': The Ordination of Women as a Turning Point for LGBT Jews", which appears in the book The Sacred Calling: Four Decades of Women in the Rabbinate, published in 2016.

Community service 
Eger has worked extensively with people with HIV/AIDS,  and is widely known as an expert on Judaism and LGBT civil rights.

Rabbi Eger has made activism in pursuit of justice for all people a cornerstone of her rabbinate.   She has been active in helping to negotiate for improved labor conditions in local hotels and in the agriculture industry; in working for a moratorium on the death penalty in California and in efforts to halt genocide and crimes against humanity around the world.
She has worked extensively with people with AIDS. Eger has facilitated an HIV+ support group for 30 years.  She served as co-chair of the Community Advisory Board of the Shanti Foundation and is a past Chair of the Spiritual Advisory Committee of AIDS Project Los Angeles.  She is past co-chair of the Institutional Review Board for Search Alliance, an AIDS drug research organization. She cofounded the LGBT Interfaith Clergy Group of Southern California and served as its first president.
She served on as a founding member of the board of ZIONESS, a progressive Pro-Israel advocacy organization.  She has helped to mentor young rabbinical students at the Hebrew Union College and also served as a mentor to rabbinical students for AIPAC.  She is a founding member of the Religion and Faith Council of the Human Rights Campaign. She served on the Board of the No On Knight Campaign/No on Proposition 22. and sat on the Board of the Equality for All/No on Prop 8. She was a founder of the California Faith for Equality and helped to organize Jews for Marriage Equality. Rabbi Eger is a Trustee of the Reform Pension Board, a joint project of the Union for Reform Judaism and the Central Conference of American Rabbis. She also sits on the Camp Committee for the URJ's Henry S. Jacobs Camp, in Utica, MS.

Honors

References

External links
 Denise Eger's blog

1960 births
Living people
American Reform rabbis
Hebrew Union College – Jewish Institute of Religion alumni
LGBT rabbis
People from Memphis, Tennessee
Reform women rabbis
21st-century American Jews
21st-century LGBT people